The 2016–17 I liga (currently named Nice I liga due to sponsorship reasons) was the 9th season of the Polish I liga under its current title, and the 69th season of the second highest division in the Polish football league system since its establishment in 1949. The league is operated by the Polish Football Association (PZPN). The league is contested by 18 teams. The regular season was played in a round-robin tournament. The season began on 29 July 2016, and concluded on 4 June 2017. After the 19th matchday the league will be on winter break between 28 November 2016 and 2 March 2017.

According to the competition rules, all clubs are required to field at least one youth player (born on 1996 or later and Polish or trained in Poland) in every game (except for the times when the only youth player on the roster is sent off or unable to continue playing).

Changes from last season
The following teams have changed division since the 2015–16 season.

To I liga
Relegated from Ekstraklasa
 Górnik Zabrze
 Podbeskidzie Bielsko-Biała
Promoted from II liga
 Stal Mielec
 Znicz Pruszków
 GKS Tychy
 Wisła Puławy

From I liga
Promoted to Ekstraklasa
 Arka Gdynia
 Wisła Płock
Relegated to II liga
 GKS Bełchatów
 Rozwój Katowice
Dissolved
 Zawisza Bydgoszcz
Withdrew
 Dolcan Ząbki

Team overview

Stadiums and locations

 Upgrading to 31,871.

League table

Positions by round

Results

I liga play-off
The 15th place team from the regular season will compete in a play-off with the 4th place team from II liga. Matches will be played on 11 and 18 June 2017. The winner will compete in the 2017–18 I liga season.

Bytovia won 6–0 on aggregate and stayed in I liga for next season.

Top goalscorers

See also
2016–17 Ekstraklasa

References 

2016–17 in Polish football
Poland
I liga seasons